Indian Creek is a tributary of the Elwha River located in Washington in the United States.

Indian Creek flows from Lake Sutherland into the former Lake Aldwell. Historically, Indian Creek supported runs of several anadromous salmon and trout species, including all five species of Pacific Salmon. However, with construction of the Elwha Dam in 1913, fish were blocked from accessing the Pacific Ocean.

While the Elwha Dam was in operation, Indian Creek sustained populations of kokanee sockeye salmon, which spawned in Lake Sutherland and migrated to Lake Aldwell to use as their ocean. It also contained stream resident coastal rainbow trout, coastal cutthroat trout, and introduced eastern brook trout.

With the removal of the Elwha Dam in 2012, the native salmonids began a return to their anadromous lifestyle, with spawning activities of true anadromous Chinook salmon observed in late 2013.

See also
List of rivers of Washington

References

Rivers of Washington (state)
Rivers of Clallam County, Washington